Kadiogo is a province of Burkina Faso, located in its Centre Region. Its area is of 2,805 km2, containing six departments and a population of 3,032,668 (2019). Its capital is also the state capital, Ouagadougou. It features the central plateau of the country. It is highly urbanized and is both the most populated and the most densely populated province.

Departments
Kadiogo is divided into seven departments:

See also
Regions of Burkina Faso
Provinces of Burkina Faso
Departments of Burkina Faso

References

 
Provinces of Burkina Faso